= Wild Seasons (Kay Young) =

Botany book

Wild Seasons: Gathering and Cooking Wild plants of the Great Plains
- Author: Kay Young
- Language: English
- Genre: non-fiction
- Published: August 1, 1993
- Publisher: University of Nebraska Press
- Publication place: United States
- ISBN: 0803299044

Wild Seasons: Gathering and Cooking Wild Plants of the Great Plains is a 1993 nonfiction book by author, illustrator, and ethno-botanist Kay Young. It features a variety of wild plants of the Great Plains of the United States, and tells how to prepare them. The book includes a number of recipes, as well as Young's enthusiasm and advocacy for eating wild crops. It was published by University of Nebraska Press.
